Ghazi-Barotha Hydropower Project is a 1,450 MW run-of-the-river hydropower connected to the Indus River about  west of Attock in Punjab and east of Haripur in Khyber Pakhtunkhwa, Pakistan. Construction of the project that began in 1995 consists of 5 generators each with a maximum power generation capacity of 290MW. Inauguration of the plant on 19 August 2003 by President General Pervez Musharraf  also saw the commissioning of the first 2 of the 5 generators i.e. Unit 1 and Unit 2.  The last generator was commissioned on 6 April 2004 and the project was completed by that December. It cost US$2.1 billion with funding from Pakistan's Water and Power Development Authority (WAPDA), the World Bank, Asian Development Bank, Japan Bank for International Cooperation, Kreditanstalt für Wiederaufbau, European Investment Bank and Islamic Development Bank.

About 1,600 cubic meter per second of water is diverted from the Indus River near the town of Ghazi, Khyber Pakhtunkhwa, about 7 km downstream of Tarbela Dam (3,478 MW). It then runs through a 100 metre wide and 9 metre deep open power channel which is entirely concrete along its 52 km length down to the village of Barotha where the power complex is located. In the reach from Ghazi to Barotha, the Indus River inclines by 76 meters over a distance of 63 km. After passing through the powerhouse, the water is returned to the Indus. In addition to these main works, transmission lines stretch 225 km.

The World Bank classed it "A" for adequate attention to environmental and social issues. The feasibility report was prepared in 1993 during the first tenure of Benazir Bhutto's administration and the Government of Pakistan entered into an agreement for the financing and construction of the project on 7 March 1996.

Main Features

Overview 
About 1,600 cubic meter per second of water is diverted from the Indus River near the town of Ghazi, Khyber Pakhtunkhwa about 7 km downstream of Tarbela Dam (3,478 MW). It then runs through a 100 metre wide and 9 metre deep open power channel down to the village of Barotha where the power complex is located. In the reach from Ghazi to Barotha, the Indus River inclines by 76 meters over a distance of 63 km. After passing through the powerhouse, the water is returned to the Indus. In addition to these main works, transmission lines stretch 225 km.

Construction Costs 
It cost US$2.25 billion with most cost contribution coming from Pakistan's own Water and Power Development Authority (WAPDA) of US$1.1 billion. Other contributors World Bank's loan of $350 million, Asian Development Bank's loan of $300 million, Japan Bank of International Cooperation offering of $350 million, Islamic Development Bank, KFW Germany's loan of  $150 million and European Investment Bank raised a  total sum of 1.1 billion dollars for the project. The construction of a 225 km, 500kV transmission line, a new 500/22kV substation, and the extension of two further substations was partially funded ($30 million) by the Kuwait Fund for Arab Economic Development in late 1998.

Construction Partners 
A number of countries worked on the project The power house and civil works were constructed by China's Dongfang Electric Corporation; a 51.90 km power channel that took water from the river and then returned it after running it through a battery of Francis turbines was constructed by Italy; turbines came from Germany; and Japan supplied Toshiba generators. 5 steel reinforced penstocks each measuring 10.6m in diameter were supplied by Austrian VA Tech Voest.

Barrage 
The Barrage located 7 km downstream of Tarbela Dam, provides a pond which re-regulates the daily discharge from Tarbela by diverting the flow into the Power Channel, adding compensation water during the low flow seasons. The principal features include 20 No. standard bays, 8 No. under sluices and 8 No. head regulator bays in addition to rim embankments, fuse plug and dividing island. The Barrage can pass the design flood of 18,700 cumecs, equivalent to the flood of record. The fuse plug has been provided to pass the extreme flood up to the capacity of Tarbela’s spillway and tunnels equalling 46,200 cumecs.

Power Channel 
The channel is 51.90 km long with a concrete lining and design flow of up to 1600 cumecs at a water depth of 9m. It has a bottom width of 58.4m. The Power Channel has a nearly contour alignment with hills on the left side and the land naturally draining towards the Indus River on the right side.

Turbines and Generators 
The station has an assembly of five 295MW Francis turbines. To operate the power station, water from the Indus is directed to the turbines via a 52 km-long canal and five pressure pipelines, each measuring 10.6m in diameter. The head of water at the power station is 69 m. The flow rate through each turbine at rated power is 485 m³/s, with each turbine runner having a diameter of 6.5m. The five units have an outer diameter of 10.6m, a total weight of 9,300 tonnes.

Comparison to Tarbela 
The primary purpose of the project was to provide constant peak power at times when Tarbela is generating low. Furthermore, it must be kept in mind the sole purpose of Tarbela Dam is to provide water for irrigation. At times when irrigation requirement is low, water flow through the channel is low and so is the power generation. It is also possible to have no power generation from Tarbela. During the months of May and June when there is reduced generation of power from Tarbela and Mangla as a result of low reservoir levels. This brings us to the most outstanding feature of this project that it will provide power peaking capacity throughout the year with full power generation.

Environmental aspects 
The project has negligible impact on existing groundwater table or quality of water due to complete length of the power channel being concrete-based. Adding to the benefits, the power channel under drainage system also helped alleviate existing water-logging problems in this part of the region. Dislocation and resettlement problems are also very small, only 110 dwellings had to be relocated to 3 villages constructed by WAPDA nearby. It is the most cost-effective power facility in Pakistan at this time and remains valid in retrospect due to the extremely favourable power generation costs in comparison with thermal power stations.

See also 

 List of hydroelectric power stations
 List of power stations in Pakistan

References

External links 
 ADB Ghazi-Barotha Project Completion Report
 Mott MacDonald Data on Ghazi-Barotha
 Power Technology Data on Ghazi-Barotha
 WAPDA Data on Ghazi-Barotha

Energy infrastructure completed in 2004
Dams on the Indus River
Hydroelectric power stations in Pakistan
Run-of-the-river power stations
2004 establishments in Pakistan
Dams completed in 2003
Embankment dams
Attock District
Energy in Punjab, Pakistan